Robert Joseph Raco (born November 26, 1989) is a Canadian actor and model. Raco is the co-owner of Essex County Drums, a custom drum manufacturer based in the Windsor, Ontario area, that he and his father started in 2005. He is known for his roles in the series Riverdale, where he plays Joaquin DeSantos, and Supernatural, where he plays Clark Barker. His latest acting work includes a starring role in the horror film Archons where he plays a musician named Eric Patrick.

Filmography

Music videos

References

External links

Living people
1989 births
21st-century Canadian male actors
Canadian male stage actors
Canadian male television actors
Canadian male models
Male actors from Windsor, Ontario
Musicians from Windsor, Ontario